Svinná  is a village and municipality in Trenčín District in the Trenčín Region of north-western Slovakia.

History
In historical records the village was first mentioned in 1439.

Geography
The municipality lies at an altitude of 248 metres and covers an area of 8.601 km². It has a population of about 1516 people.

External links
http://www.svinna.sk
http://www.statistics.sk/mosmis/eng/run.html

Villages and municipalities in Trenčín District